Norbert Pacławski (born 19 February 2004) is a Polish professional footballer who plays as a forward for Lech Poznań.

Career statistics

Club

References

External links

2004 births
Living people
Polish footballers
Poland youth international footballers
Association football forwards
Lech Poznań II players
Lech Poznań players
Ekstraklasa players
II liga players
People from Rzeszów